Szamba is a 1996 Hungarian comedy film directed by Róbert Koltai.

Cast 
 László Görög - Ottó Szamba Jr.
 Róbert Koltai - Szamba Ottó
 Éva Kerekes - Éva
 Zsolt László - Géza
 Piroska Molnár - Klári, mother of Ottó Szamba Jr.
 Judit Hernádi - Jutka
 Judit Pogány - Lidi
 Andor Lukáts - Dezsö
 Tamás Jordán - Osztályfõnök
 László Helyey - Beszédtanár
 Pál Mácsai - Fõrendezõ
 Lajos Kovács - Színházigazgató
 Ádám Rajhona - Babits

References

External links 

1996 comedy films
1996 films
Hungarian comedy films